Dennis O'Sullivan may refer to:

Dennis O'Sullivan (American football) (born 1976), American football player
Dennis O'Sullivan (Australian footballer) (born 1946), for the Carlton Football Club
Dennis O'Sullivan, see Roman Catholicism in Liberia

See also
Denis O'Sulivan (disambiguation)
Dennis Sullivan (disambiguation)